This is a list of diplomatic missions of the Marshall Islands. The Republic of the Marshall Islands maintains a small diplomatic network.

America

 Washington, D.C. (Embassy)
 Honolulu (Consulate)
 Springdale (Consulate)

Asia

 Tokyo (Embassy)

 Taipei (Embassy)

 Seoul (Embassy)

Oceania

 Suva (Embassy)

Multilateral organisations
 
New York City (Permanent Mission)

Gallery

See also
 Marshall Islands
 Foreign relations of the Marshall Islands

References

External links
Embassy of the Republic of the Marshall Islands to the United States of America
Permanent Mission of the Republic of the Marshall Islands to the United Nations

Diplomatic missions
Marshall Islands